Emil Cauer the Younger (1867-1946) was a German sculptor, known for his monuments and fountains in Berlin.

Life and work 
He was born to the sculptor, Karl Cauer and his wife Elisabeth Magdalene, née Schmidt. His grandfather, Emil, was the first of a long line of sculptors in the Cauer family.

His first lessons were in his father's studio, followed by studies in Rome, from 1886 to 1887, at the workshop belonging to his uncle, Robert. After that, he worked as a freelance sculptor, which included several stays in the United States, in St. Louis, where his family had professional connections. From 1893, he divided his time between Berlin and Bad Kreuznach. 

In 1898, he finally opened his own studio in Berlin. He mostly produced portrait busts, but also received some commissions for public statues. In 1899, for the city of Hagen, he designed a six-meter (19.6 ft.) bronze monument to Kaiser Friedrich III. Three years later, he designed the seven meter (22.9 ft.) stone and bronze "Drei-Kaiser-Brunnen" (Three Emperor Fountain), also for Hagen. 

Most of his notable works were done for Berlin. One of his largest works is the "Kriegerdenkmal für gefallene Feldeisenbahner" (War Memorial to Fallen Field Railwaymen), on the Invalidenstraße in the courtyard of the former "Royal Museum of Transport and Construction" at the Hamburger Bahnhof (now the Museum für Gegenwart).

In 1906, he moved to Darmstadt to join his brother, Robert. There, he specialized in reliefs, many with religious subjects, for public and private clients, although he continued to produce busts. He was named a Professor by Grand Duke Ernst Ludwig in 1916.

References

Further reading 
  (Family article)
 Elke Masa: Die Bildhauerfamilie Cauer im 19. und 20. Jahrhundert. Neun Bildhauer aus vier Generationen – Emil Cauer d. Ä., Carl Cauer, Robert Cauer d. Ä., Robert Cauer d. J., Hugo Cauer, Ludwig Cauer, Emil Cauer d. J., Stanislaus Cauer, Hanna Cauer. Gebr. Mann, Berlin 1989, 
 Anne Tesch: Die Bildhauerfamilie Cauer. 2nd ed., Harrach, Bad Kreuznach 1977,  
 Biography of Cauer @ Munzinger-Archiv

External links 

 Entry for Emil Cauer @ the Rheinland-Pfälzische Personendatenbank
 Works by Cauer @ Bildhauerei in Berlin

1867 births
1946 deaths
German sculptors
Busts (sculpture)
People from Bad Kreuznach